"Paradisus Judaeorum" is a Latin phrase which became one of four members of a 19th-century Polish-language proverb that described the Polish–Lithuanian Commonwealth (1569–1795) as "heaven for the nobility, purgatory for townspeople, hell for peasants, paradise for Jews."  The proverb's earliest attestation is an anonymous 1606 Latin pasquinade that begins, "Regnum Polonorum est" ("The Kingdom of Poland is"). Stanisław Kot surmised that its author may have been a Catholic cleric who criticized what he regarded as defects of the realm; the pasquinade excoriates virtually every group and class of society.

The phrase "Paradisus Iudaeorum" appears as the epigram to a POLIN Museum of the History of Polish Jews gallery that ends in a "Corridor of Fire symbolis[ing] the Khmelnytsky Uprising" (1648-1657). Mikołaj Gliński notes that Jews consider the latter uprising to have been "the biggest national catastrophe since the destruction of Solomon's Temple."

Some commentators have read the phrase, "Paradisus Iudaeorum", as an observation on the favorable situation of Jews in the Kingdom of Poland and the subsequent Polish–Lithuanian Commonwealth, a polity that was notable for giving Jews special privileges from the Statute of Kalisz of 1264, while Jews faced persecution and murder in Western Europe. Other commentators have read the phrase as antisemitic – as suggesting that the Jews of the Polish–Lithuanian Commonwealth were overprivileged. Most present-day usage relates to the  first interpretation.

History of versions
While the saying has sometimes been attributed to the 16th-century Polish rabbi Moses Isserles, the Polish literary historian Stanisław Kot provided the earliest printed attestation of part of the saying — "Heaven for the nobles, purgatory for townspeople, hell for  peasants, and paradise for Jews" — in an anonymous 1606 Latin text, one of two that are jointly known by the Polish title, Paskwiliusze na królewskim weselu podrzucone ("Pasquinades Planted at Royal Wedding Celebration"), in reference to the wedding of Sigismund III Vasa and Constance of Austria that had taken place on 11 December 1605.

Of the two texts attributed to the same anonymous author, the part that became the proverb appeared in the "Regnum Polonorum est" ("The Kingdom of Poland Is"). Parts of the text were quoted in Bishop Stanisław Zremba's 1623 work, "Okulary na rozchody w Koronie..." and were included in a 1636 work by Szymon Starowolski. The phrase, "heaven for the nobility", which became a regular part of the proverb, was added by the German Jesuit priest Michael Radau in his 1672 work, Orator extemporeneus; Polish-literature scholar Julian Krzyżanowski suggests that Radau had coined this phrase as early as 1641.

Several variants of the 1606 pasquinade appeared in shorter Latin versions, by the Croat Juraj Križanić (1664), the Italian  (1685), and the Slovak  (1708-9).

Kot thinks that the anonymous author of the 1606 pasquinade may have been inspired by examples of proverbs from other European countries. Sixteenth-century England was depicted as "the paradise of women, the hell of horses, and the purgatory of servants". Variants of this described France and Italy. Kot concluded that proverbs of this sort likely inspired the anonymous author of the 1606 Polish pasquinade.

The first translation of the 1606 Polish pasquinade from Latin into Polish appeared in the 1630s. Kot translated it in 1937.

Pasquinade 
The identity of the author is unknown. Kot wrote that he may have been a Catholic townsman, perhaps a priest jealous of the influence of Jews and others, such as Protestants and nobility, who somehow competed with Catholic townspeople. Konrad Matyjaszek describes it as "expressing anti-gentry and anti-Jewish sentiments". According to Barbara Kirshenblatt-Gimblett, it was political satire, "a pasquinade critical of everything in the Polish–Lithuanian Commonwealth—foreigners, immigrants, 'heretics,' peasants, burghers, and servants, and also Jews." Kot writes that other versions in the 17th and 18th centuries criticized the clergy, Gypsies, Italians, Germans, Armenians, and Scots: groups were added or removed from the list, depending on the authors' allegiances.

Krzyżanowski sees the 1606 text as a satire on all of Polish society. Some 17th- and 18th-century Polish authors, themselves either nobles or clients of the nobility, saw it as an attack on the nobility's Golden Freedoms and ascribed it to a foreign author, refusing to accept that a scathing criticism of Polish society could come from a Polish author. Kot writes that the pasquinades are some of the most pointed examples of self-criticism originating in Polish society and that the nobility's refusal to accept that such criticism could come from within that society reflects sadly on the deterioration of Polish discourse in the 18th and 19th centuries.

Proverb 
Over time, the 1606 pasquinade lapsed into obscurity, reduced to the popular proverb, that described the historical Polish–Lithuanian Commonwealth (1569–1795) as "heaven for the nobility, purgatory for townspeople, hell for peasants, paradise for Jews.". The proverb contrasts the disparate situations of four social classes in the Polish–Lithuanian Commonwealth. The privileged nobility (szlachta) is at the top ("heaven for the nobility"), and the impoverished, usually enserfed peasantry are at the bottom ("hell for peasants"). The other two commonly named classes are the townspeople (or burghers) and the Jews. By the 16th century, the position of townspeople in the Commonwealth had been in decline (hence, "purgatory for townspeople"). The situation of the Commonwealth's Jews, while similar to that of the townspeople, was fairly secure and prosperous, particularly compared to the situation of Jews in most other European countries. Due to its criticism of the nobility, the proverb was most popular among townspeople; much less so among the nobility, whose writers, if they referred to it, used it mainly in the context of Polish Jewry. The proverb has been described as still (as of 2004) very popular in Poland, and as often influencing people's views about the situation of the social classes, particularly the Jews, in the Commonwealth.

In various versions of the proverb, phrases appear in varying order and sometimes do not appear at all; there are also some minor changes in wording. Križanić, for example, writes "paradisus Hebraeorum" ("paradise for Hebrews") rather than "paradise for Jews". A five-part proverb variant appears in a treatise, Palatinum Reginae Liberatis (c. 1670), by the Polish Jesuit , who omits mention of the townspeople, instead adding "purgatory for royalty" and "limbo for clergy". Another five-part 1861 German variant ("Polen ist der Bauern Hölle, der Juden Paradies, der Burger Fegefeuer, der Edelleute Himmel, und der Fremden Goldgrube" – "Poland is hell for peasants, paradise for Jews, purgatory for townspeople, heaven for the nobility, and goldmine for foreigners") includes the 1606 pasquinade's "goldmine for foreigners",  which did not make it into the final modern proverb that lists the nobility, townspeople, peasants, and Jews. Samuel Adalberg's 1887 paremiology records a four-part version ("Polska niebem dla szlachty, czyśćcem dla mieszczan, piekłem dla chłopów, a rajem dla Żydów" – "Poland is heaven for the nobility, purgatory for townspeople, hell for peasants, and paradise for Jews") that is closest to the 1606 original, which latter differs only in the order of the phrases and in not including "heaven for the nobility".

Paradisus Judaeorum
The origin of the phrase "paradisus Judaeorum" ("paradise of the Jews") has been described as antisemitic, and the 1606 pasquinade's author as having viewed Poland as being run by overprivileged Jews. In the centuries since, the phrase has lost its negative connotations and has been used to refer to the golden age of Jewish life in Poland. For example, John Klier titled a chapter in his book about Eastern European Jewish history "Poland–Lithuania: 'Paradise for Jews, and Gershon Hundert writes:"The Polish Jewish community was vibrant, creative, proud and self-confident [...]. Their neighbours knew this as well, referring to Poland as Paradisus Judaeorum [...]. The full expression went: 'Poland is heaven for the nobility, hell for the peasants and paradise for Jews'." The process of transformation of this phrase from antisemitic to philosemitic has been described by Piotr Konieczny as an example of linguistic reclamation.

The comparison of Jewish and noble classes has generally been described as exaggerated (Hundert himself writes that it was hyperbole), as the Jewish situation in early modern Poland, while comparatively privileged compared to many other classes in the Commonwealth, and to the Jewish position in many other contemporary countries, was hardly idyllic. Norman Davies says Jews "were widely denounced as the chosen instrument of 'the Polish lords'" in Ukraine.

In the POLIN Museum of the History of Polish Jews that opened in Warsaw in 2013, a gallery covering the "Golden Age of Polish Jewry" was named, "Paradisus Iudaeorum". The gallery's name became a subject of discussion when in 2016 Joanna Tokarska-Bakir argued that its use for the gallery was disrespectful. Barbara Kirshenblatt-Gimblett, Program Director of the Core Exhibition of the POLIN Museum, says that the intention is to engage the reader in a complex debate going beyond a binary black-and-white oversimplification. In 2017 Kamil Kijek wrote that, out of context, the phrase can indeed be confusing, but within a broader context it is representative of a much more complex, nuanced relationship between Jews and non-Jewish Poles.

Latin texts

Notes

References

Further reading
 

Jewish Polish history
Social history of the Polish–Lithuanian Commonwealth
Latin proverbs
17th-century Polish literature
1606 works
Satirical works
Antisemitism in Poland